The Correctional Services Bureau (DSC) is the agency responsible for maintaining inmates in Macau, China. It is under the administration of the Secretariat for Security.

History

On 1 January 2016, Macau Prison and the Youth Correctional Institution that was under the Legal Affairs Bureau were re-structured as the Correctional Services Bureau.

Functions
Per article 1 of Administrative Regulation No. 27/2015, the duties of the agency are to:

Collaborate in defining prison policies and policies relating to the activities of the Youth Correctional Institution;
Ensure the administrative and financial management of Coloane Prison and the Youth Correctional Institution, prepare regulations and exercise technical guidance and superintendence;
Ensure the organization and operation relating to the management and system of prison affairs;
Ensure the organization and operation relating to the management and system of educational guardianship measures for detained youths;
Cooperate, within the scope of its duties, with private entities to promote the social reintegration of prisoners and detained youths.

Population

In 2004, there were about 921 (784 men and 137 women) inmates in the prison and divided amongst male and female inmates. With the 2010 population at 926, a new prison is being built in Ka Ho as the current facility can only hold 1500. The new prison was scheduled to open in 2014. However, this has since been delayed.

Circa 2014 there were 959 prisoners, including 195 women. The total occupancy rate was 84%, with the women's area having an occupancy rate of 83%. Circa 2014 an expansion of the women's area was to add capacity for an additional 315 prisoners.

Ranks
Per Law No. 2/2008 (Restructure of the Careers in the Security Forces and Departments), the following ranks are observed in the agency:

 Chief Superintendent (Comissário-Chefe)
 Superintendent (Comissário)
 Chief Officer (Chefe)
 Officer (Subchefe)
 Principal Prison Guard (Guarda Principal)
 1st Class Prison Guard (Guarda de 1ª)
 Prison Guard (Guarda)

Facilities
Due to the area's small population, there is only one prison for adults in Macau, Coloane Prison (or EPC), also known as Macau Prison (or EPM) was opened in 1990 and replaced the former Central Prison on the mainland (built from 1904 to 1909). The facility consists of a series or connected buildings surrounded by a white wall with barbed wire. Four watchtowers are found along the prison walls.

There is also a juvenile detention facility in Macau, the Youth Correctional Institution, also in Coloane, with sections for boys and girls.

Due to Coloane Prison being at almost full capacity, a new facility is under construction in Ka Ho. Construction of this facility began in 2010 and was scheduled to open by 2014 but has since been delayed.

The UK FCDO stated that overcrowding began to be an issue at Coloane Prison since 2010.

In October 1998 the prison had separate areas for members of Macau triads. That year stated that the facility "is not the worst place to wind up behind bars."

See also
 Hong Kong Correctional Services

References

Prison and correctional agencies
Government departments and agencies of Macau
1904 establishments in Macau
1904 establishments in the Portuguese Empire
Law enforcement agencies of Macau
Macau